The Peripatetic axiom is: "Nothing is in the intellect that was not first in the senses"  (Latin: "Nihil est in intellectu quod non sit prius in sensu"). It is found in Thomas Aquinas's De veritate, q. 2 a. 3 arg. 19.

Aquinas adopted this principle from the Peripatetic school of Greek philosophy, established by Aristotle. Aquinas argued that the existence of God could be proved by reasoning from sense data. He used a variation on the Aristotelian notion of the "active intellect" ("intellectus agens") which he interpreted as the ability to abstract universal meanings from particular empirical data.

References 

Empiricism
Thomism
Concepts in epistemology
Aristotelianism